Valeriy Radchenko is a retired Soviet and Ukrainian football player.

Career
Valeriy Radchenko, started his career in 2003 at Dynamo-3 Kyiv in Kyiv until 2007, where he played 10 games and scoring 3 goals. In 2008 he moved to Poltava for one season and in 2010 he moved to Sumy where he played 3 matches. In 2011 he moved to Krymteplytsia Molodizhne. In the same season he moved to Desna Chernihiv, the main club of Chernihiv, where he played 11 matches and scored 1 goal. In 2012 he returned to Poltava and Bucha.

Honours
Sumy
 Ukrainian Second League: Runner-Up 2010–11

References

External links 
 Valeriy Radchenko allplayers.in.ua
 Valeriy Radchenko footballfacts.ru

1988 births
Living people
Soviet footballers
Ukrainian footballers
FC Desna Chernihiv players
FC Poltava players
PFC Sumy players
FC Krymteplytsia Molodizhne players
FC Karlivka players
FC Bucha players
FC Dynamo-3 Kyiv players
Ukrainian Second League players
Ukrainian First League players
Association football midfielders